Li Shuoxun (1903 Sichuan – 1931 Hainan) is a Chinese communist martyr. He joined the Chinese Communist Party in 1924, and went underground after the Kuomintang (KMT)'s massacre of communists in 1927.  In 1931 he went to Hainan, was caught by the KMT and executed.  He is now commemorated as a revolutionary martyr.

His son, Li Peng, was adopted by Zhou Enlai and served as Premier of the People's Republic of China from 1987 to 1998.

References

 Heroes and models of new China: Li Shuoxun
 Martyr Li Shuoxun's Memorial Pavilion

1903 births
1931 deaths
Chinese communists
Executed people from Sichuan
Executed writers
People executed by the Republic of China
Li Peng family